Fergie Duhamel is an American singer, songwriter, rapper, fashion designer and actress. She has won a total of 70 (career solo and Black Eyed Peas) awards.

ALMA Awards

American Music Awards
The American Music Awards are an award show created in 1973.

ASCAP

Berlin Music Video Awards 
Berlin Music Video Awards is an annual festival and networking event that puts creators working behind the camera in the spotlight.The event takes place in Berlin, Germany and consists of music video marathons, live performances, filmmaking workshops and networking events. Creators can apply to several different categories including: Best Animation, Best Song, Best Narrative, Best Concept, Best Director, Best Editor, Best Experimental, Best Visual Effects, Most Trashy, Most Bizarre, Best Production Company, Best Low Budget and Best Art Director. The winners of each category, picked by a professional jury panel, compete in the finals, the Best Music Video and the main prize is 3.000€. Berlin Music Video Awards was founded in 2013 by a producer and event planner Aviel Silook.

BET Awards

Billboard Women in Music
Established in 2007, the Billboard Women in Music recognizes influential female artists and music executives who have made significant contributions to the business and who, through their work and continued success, inspire generations of women to take on increasing responsibilities within the field.

BRIT Awards

Channel [V] Thailand Music Video Awards

ECHO Awards, Germany

Do Something Awards

Glamour Awards

Grammy Awards

IFPI Hong Kong Top Sales Music Awards

Juno Awards

Mnet Asian Music Awards

MOBO Awards

MTV Awards

Los Premios MTV Latinoamérica

MTV Asia Awards

MTV Australia Music Video Awards

MTV Europe Music Awards

MTV Russia Music Award

MTV Video Music Awards Japan

MTV Video Music Awards

MTV Music Video Awards Japan

MuchMusic Video Awards

NAACP Awards

NewNowNext Awards

Nickelodeon Kids' Choice Awards

Meus Prêmios Nick, Brazil

NRJ Music Awards

NRJ Radio Awards

People's Choice Awards

Premios 40 Principales
The Premios 40 Principales is an annual Spanish awards show that recognises the people and works of pop musicians.

Radio Music Awards

Rock (The Vote) Awards

Satellite Awards

Soul Train Music Awards

Screen Actors Guild Awards

Teen Choice Awards

TMF Awards (Netherlands)

UK Music Video Awards

Vibe Awards

Washington DC Area Film Critics Association Awards

World Music Awards

Young Entertainer Awards

References

Fergie